Human rights in post-invasion Iraq have been the subject of concerns and controversies since the 2003 U.S. invasion. Concerns have been expressed about conduct by insurgents, the U.S.-led coalition forces and the Iraqi government. The U.S. is investigating several allegations of violations of international and internal standards of conduct in isolated incidents by its own forces and contractors. The UK is also conducting investigations of alleged human rights abuses by its forces. War crime tribunals and criminal prosecution of the numerous crimes by insurgents are likely years away. In late February 2009, the U.S. State Department released a report on the human rights situation in Iraq, looking back on the prior year (2008).

Human rights abuses by insurgents

Abuses of Human Rights conducted by, or alleged to have been conducted by, Iraq-based insurgents and/or terrorists include:

August 2003
Bombing of the U.N. headquarters in Baghdad in August 2003 which killed the top U.N. representative in Iraq, 55-year-old Vieira de Mello, a Brazilian, who was also the UN High Commissioner for Human Rights. 22 UN staff members were killed and more than 100 injured in the explosion. The dead also included Nadia Younes, former Executive Director at World Health Organization (WHO) in charge of External Relations and Governing Bodies. The terrorist attack was condemned by UN Secretary General Kofi Annan and denounced by the UN security council.

June 2004
South Korean translator Kim Sun-il beheaded by followers of al-Zarqawi.

July 2004
Tawhid and Jihad behead Bulgarian truck drivers Ivaylo Kepov and Georgi Lazov. Al-Jazeera broadcast the videotape containing the killing, but said the portion with the actual killing was too graphic to broadcast.

December 2004
Italian photographer, 52-year-old Salvatore Santoro, beheaded in a video. Islamic Movement of Iraqi Mujahedeen claimed responsibility.

February 2005
Al-Iraqiya TV (Iraq) aired transcripts of confessions by Syrian intelligence officer Anas Ahmad Al-Issa and Iraqi terrorist Shihab Al-Sab'awi concerning their booby-trap operations, explosions, kidnappings, assassinations, and details of beheading training in Syria.

July 2005
Egyptian and Algerian envoys.

Two Algerian Diplomats were reported to have been killed by Al-Qaida in Iraq. Al-Qaeda in Iraq issued an Internet statement saying it killed two kidnapped Algerian diplomats, Ali Belaroussi and Azzedine Belkadi. “The court of al-Qaeda in Iraq has decided to carry out God’s verdict against the two diplomats from the apostate Algerian government ... and ordered to kill them,” said the statement, which was signed by Abu Maysara al-Iraqi, the al-Qaeda spokesman.
Egyptian Diplomat by Al-Qaida was reported to have been killed. Al-Qaida in Iraq posted on a web forum a statement that it killed Egyptian diplomat al-Sherif. Top Sunni cleric Mohamed Sayed Tantawi condemned the killing as a "crime against religion, morality and humanity and a crime that goes against honour and chivalry".

February 2006
Although no injuries occurred in the blast, the bombing resulted in violence over the following days. Over 100 dead bodies with bullet holes were found on February 23, and at least 165 people are thought to have been killed.

June 2006
Video of the killing of four Russian diplomats kidnapped in Iraq appear on the Internet. A group called the Mujahideen Shura Council released the hostage video.

July 2006
Anba' Al Iraq News agency, Writers without Borders Organisation condemn the imprisonment of its staff member, Husain E. Khadir who was in charge of covering documentaries about the type of threats Kurdistan Federal region imposes to its Neighboring countries. Delegation of Human Rights Watch (HRW) released reports about torture in Iraq and repression of human rights and freedom of expression. HRW interviewed several detained writers and journalists to document such violation.[17][18] Mr. Khadir was detained in Karkuk then moved to Arbil where Human Rights Watch (HRW) visited him in one of the detention places.
Last year in Baghdad, the same writer suffered even worse when he escaped from Shiia militia, who seized his house and threw his family in the streets, which was considered as a serious threat directed against his life. The move is widely exercised in Iraq in a retaliation against human rights activists, journalists and writers who express critics to the Iraqi government and Shiia coalition party. Several press and media agencies criticized loudly the Iraqi Shiia Coalition during the constitution-writing process. Khadir led a campaign to amend the constitution and urged for a constitution to be as peace building tool which brings all parties and opponents to a national consensus and social cohesion rather than a state building as the ruling party is regularly saying. UNAMI commented that most of these civil society activities were and are supported by the UN agencies, International donors or the US and British governments.
IRIN/UN news agency revealed that journalists and writers are the most vulnerable victims to killing, deaths, threats, kidnapping, torture and detention are commonly exercised by uncontrolled Iraqi forces, paramilitary organisations and Shiia or Suni militias. Similarity to this specific case is occurring and spreading in the south, centre and the north of Iraq.

The number of killed journalists and writers in Iraq has exceeded 220 this year. The Iraqi organisation for Supporting Journalists victims reported to IRIN.

US National Guard Sergeant Frank "Greg" Ford claims that he witnessed human rights violations in Samarra, Iraq.  A subsequent Army investigation found Ford's allegations to be unfounded. Ford was also found to have displayed unauthorized "US Navy SEAL" insignia on his Army uniform; Ford had in fact never been a Navy SEAL as he had claimed for many years while serving in the Army National Guard.

Kuwaiti News Agency reports that a high ranking Iraqi security source in the Interior Ministry said that the final death toll of the 13 August bombings in the Al-Zafaraniyah district in southern Baghdad is 57 killed and 145 injured, most of them women and children. Iraqi Prime Minister Nuri al-Maliki laid the blame with Sunni extremists seeking to escalate the conflict.

Human rights abuses by coalition forces

Prison and interrogation abuses by coalition forces

April 2003
An Iraqi man, Ather Karen al-Mowafakia, was shot and killed by a British soldier at a roadside checkpoint on 29 April 2003. Witnesses have alleged he was shot in the abdomen after the door of his car struck a soldier on the leg when he was getting out of his car, and that he was then dragged from the vehicle and beaten by the soldier's comrades, dying later in hospital. In seven attempts made by The Guardian to raise the issue, the MOD has refused to "explain why the individuals were detained, or say where, how or why they died."

May 2003
In May 2003, Saeed Shabram and his cousin, Menem Akaili, were thrown into the river near Basra after being detained by British troops. Akaili survived but Shabram did not as he drowned in the river. Akaili said that he and Shabram were approached by a British patrol and led at gunpoint down to a jetty before being forced into the river. The punishment was known as "wetting" and said to have been inflicted on local youths suspected of looting. "Wetting was supposed to humiliate those suspected of being petty criminals," said Sapna Malik, the family's lawyer at Leigh Day and Co. "Although the MoD denies that there was a policy of wetting to deal with suspected looters around the time of this incident, evidence we have seen suggests otherwise. "The tactics employed by the MoD appeared to include throwing or placing suspected looters into either of Basra's two main waterways." Iraqi bystanders dragged Akaili out of the water but his cousin disappeared. Shabram's body was later recovered by a diver hired by his father, Radhi Shabram. Shabram's mother waited on the river bank for four hours while a diver searched the river for Saeed. "When Saeed's corpse was finally pulled from the river, Radhi describes how it was bloated and covered with marks and bruises," said Leigh Day. Though the MOD paid compensation to Saeed Shabram's family, none of the soldiers involved were charged for his death.

Ahmed Jabbar Kareem Ali, aged 15, was on his way to work with his brother on May 8, 2003, when a group of British soldiers assaulted him. The four soldiers beat him then forced him into a canal at gunpoint to "teach him a lesson" for suspected looting. Weakened from the beating Ali received from the soldiers, he floundered. He was dead when he was pulled from the river. Four British soldiers who were involved in a separate incident with the death of an Iraqi teenager were acquitted of manslaughter.

August 2003
Hanan Saleh Matrud, an eight-year-old Iraqi girl, was killed on 21 August 2003 by a soldier of the King's Regiment, when a Warrior armoured vehicle stopped near an alley that led to her home. Three or four soldiers exited the vehicle, and group of children including Hanan gathered, attracted by the soldiers. Stories differ about what happened next. The troops claimed they came under attack from stone-throwing mobs, and the shot was fired was a "warning shot". The local crowd, on the other hand, alleged that the crowd consisted of only children, who had been "coaxed into the open by the soldiers' offers of chocolate". Hanan was shot and killed by a soldier of the King's Regiment and was hit in her lower torso, and she was rushed by the soldiers to a Czech-run hospital. Hanan died the following day after an unsuccessful operation. According to the MOD, "in the absence of impartial witness evidence or forensic evidence to suggest a soldier had acted outside the rules of engagement, no crime was established." In May 2004, after an intervention from Amnesty International, her family submitted a formal claim for proper compensation, which as of 2004 is being assessed by the MOD.

September 2003

On 14 September, Baha Mousa, a 26-year-old hotel receptionist, was arrested along with six other men and taken to a British base. While in detention, Mousa and the other captives were hooded, severely beaten, and assaulted by a number of soldiers on base. Two days later, Mousa was found dead. A post-mortem examination found that Mousa suffered multiple injuries (at least 93), including fractured ribs and a broken nose, which were "in part" the cause of his death.

Seven members of the Queen's Lancashire Regiment were tried on charges relating to the ill treatment of detainees, including those of war crimes under the International Criminal Court Act 2001. On 19 September 2006, Corporal Donald Payne pleaded guilty to a charge of inhumane treatment to persons, making him the first member of the British Armed Forces to plead guilty to a war crime. He was subsequently jailed for one year and expelled from the army. The BBC reported that the six other soldiers were cleared of any wrongdoing, and the Independent reported that the charges had been dropped, and that the presiding judge, Justice Ronald McKinnon, stated that "none of those soldiers has been charged with any offence, simply because there is no evidence against them as a result of a more or less obvious closing of ranks."

January 2004
On January 1, Ghanem Kadhem Kati, an unarmed young man, was shot twice in the back by a British soldier at the door to his home. Troops had arrived at the scene after hearing shooting, which neighbours said came from a wedding party. Investigators from the Royal Military Police exhumed the teenager's body six weeks later but have yet to offer compensation or announce any conclusion to the inquiry.

Video footage taken from the gun camera of a US Apache helicopter in Iraq was shown on ABC TV, showing the killing of suspected Iraqi insurgents. Controversy arose around the case, due to the ambiguity of the video. A cylindrical object is tossed on the ground in a field. The US military considered it to be an RPG or a mortar tube and fired upon the people. IndyMedia UK has suggested that the items may have been harmless implements of some sort. The journal also says that the helicopter opened fire on a man identified as wounded, which they say is in contradiction with international laws.

On German television, retired General Robert Gard of the US Army stated that the killings were, in his opinion, "inexcusable murders".

April 2004
On April 14, Lieutenant Ilario Pantano of the United States Marine Corps, killed two unarmed captives. Lieutenant Pantano claimed that the captives had advanced on him in a threatening manner. The officer who presided over his article 32 hearing recommended a court martial for "body desecration", but all charges against Lieutenant Pantano were dropped due to lack of credible evidence or testimony. He subsequently separated from the Marine Corps with an honorable discharge.

A video showing a group of British soldiers apparently beating several Iraqi teenagers was posted on the internet in February 2006, and shortly thereafter, on the main television networks around the world. The video, took place in April 2004 and was taken from an upper storey of a building in the southern Iraqi town of Al-Amarah, shows many Iraqis outside a coalition compound. Following an altercation in which members of the crowd tossed rocks and reportedly an improvised grenade at the soldiers, the soldiers rushed the crowd. The troopers brought some Iraqi teenagers into the compound and proceeded to beat them. The video includes a voiceover apparently by the cameraman taunting the beaten teenagers.

The individual recording could be heard saying:
Oh, yes! Oh Yes! Now you gonna get it. You little kids. You little motherfucking bitch!, you little motherfucking bitch.

The event was broadcast in mainstream media, resulting in the British government and military condemning the event. The incident became especially worrisome for British soldiers, who had enjoyed a much more favourable position than American soldiers in the region. Concerns were voiced to the media about the safety of soldiers in the country after the incident. The tape incurred criticism, albeit relatively muted, from Iraq, and media found people prepared to speak out. The Royal Military Police conducted an investigation into the event, and the prosecuting authorities determined that there was insufficient case to justify court-martial proceedings.

May 2004
In May 2004, a British soldier identified as M004 mistreated captured, unarmed prisoners of war during a 'tactical questioning' in Camp Abu Naji.

See: Mukaradeeb wedding party massacre

The village of Mukaradeeb was attacked by American helicopters on May 19, 2004, killing 42 men, women and children. The casualties, 11 of whom were women and 14 were children, were confirmed by Hamdi Noor al-Alusi, the manager of the nearest hospital. Western journalists also viewed the bodies of the children before they were buried.

November 2005
See: Haditha killings

On November 19, 24 Iraqis were killed. At least 15, and allegedly all, of those killed were non-combatant civilians and all are alleged to have been killed by a group of U.S. Marines. The following ongoing investigation claimed it found evidence that "supports accusations that U.S. Marines deliberately shot civilians, including unarmed women and children", according to an anonymous Pentagon official.

March 2006
See: Mahmudiyah killings

On March 12, an Iraqi girl was raped and murdered together with her family in the Mahmudiyah killings. The incident resulted in the offenders being prosecuted and a number of reprisal attacks against U.S. troops by insurgent forces.

See: Ishaqi incident

On March 15, 11 Iraqi civilians were allegedly bound and executed by U.S. troops in what is termed the "Ishaqi incident". A U.S. investigation found that U.S. military personnel had acted appropriately, and had followed the proper rules of engagement in responding to hostile fire and incrementally escalating force until the threat was eliminated. The Iraqi government rejected the American conclusions.  In September 2011, the Iraqi government reopened their investigation after Wikileaks published a leaked diplomatic cable regarding questions about the raid made by U.N. inspector Philip Alston, Special Rapporteur on Extrajudicial, Summary, or Arbitrary Executions.

April 2006
See: Hamdania incident

On April 26, U.S. Marines shot dead an unarmed Iraqi man. An investigation by the Naval Criminal Investigative Service resulted in charges of murder, kidnapping, and conspiracy associated with the coverup of the incident. The defendants are seven Marines and a Navy Corpsman. As of February 2007, five of the defendants have pleaded guilty to lesser charges of kidnapping and conspiracy and have agreed to testify against the remaining defendants who face murder charges. Additional Marines from the same battalion faced lesser charges of assault related to the use of physical force during interrogations of suspected insurgents.

May 2006

On May 9, U.S. troops of the 101st Airborne Division executed 3 male Iraqi detainees at the Muthana Chemical Complex. An investigation and lengthy court proceedings followed. Spc. William Hunsaker and Pfc. Corey Clagett — pleaded guilty to murder and were sentenced to 18 years each for premeditated murder. Spc. Juston Graber, pleaded guilty to aggravated assault for shooting one of the wounded detainees and was sentenced to nine months. A fourth soldier, Staff Sgt. Ray Girouard of Sweetwater, Tenn. remains convicted of obstruction of justice, conspiracy to obstruct justice and violation of a general order.

Human rights in northern Iraq

In Iraqi Kurdistan, according to a 1995 Amnesty international report, the "prime responsibility for human rights abuses lies with the two parties holding the reins of power in Iraqi Kurdistan - the KDP and PUK" due to the political and military power these parties hold. Amnesty reported that Francis Yusuf Shabo, an Assyrian Christian and politician, who was also responsible for
dealing with complaints by Assyrian Christians about disputed villages was shot dead on 31 May 1993 in Duhok and no one was yet brought to justice. Lazar Mikho Hanna (known as Abu Nasir), an Assyrian Christian and politician was shot dead  on 14 June 1993 in Duhok. Amnesty criticized the impunity given to the Kurdish political parties armed and special forces due to which assailants have not been brought to justice, and the "active undermining of the judiciary and the lack of respect for its independence by the political parties". Amnesty also reported that Kurdish forces "arrested people arbitrarily" and in some cases tortured detainees, killed civilians, and that assailants were not brought to justice.

The UNHCR reported that there have been acts of violence committed against political opponents and minorities in areas under the control of Kurdish forces. Minority leaders have claimed that in some cases Kurdish political parties and forces have "subjected them to violence, forced assimilation, discrimination, political marginalization, arbitrary arrests and detention."  UNHRC reports that Kurdish parties and forces are "considered responsible for arbitrary arrests, incommunicado detention and torture of political opponents and members of ethnic/religious minorities". UNHCR also stated that Christians have complained about attempts by Kurds to assimilate them and about "the use of force, discrimination and electoral fraud by the Kurdish parties and militias". One incident was in October 2006 when KRG forces broke into the building of a Christian media organization and detained the staff. UNHCR also reported that Christian parties have claimed "harassment and forced assimilation by Kurdish militias in Kirkuk and areas with the aim of incorporating these areas into the Region of Kurdistan", and stated that "Christians have repeatedly accused the Kurdish parties and their military forces of "acts of violence and discrimination, arbitrary arrests and detention on sectarian basis, political marginalization  (including through electoral manipulations), monopolizing of government offices,  and changing the demographics with the ultimate goal of incorporating Kirkuk and other mixed areas into the Region of Kurdistan". The Centre for Strategic and International Studies (CSIS) noted that the Kurdish parties use a form of "soft ethnic cleansing". Christians have according to UNHCR also repeatedly complained about ongoing Kurdification. The US State Department reported that “Kurdish authorities abused and discriminated against minorities in the North, including Turcomen, Arabs, Christians, and Shabak". UNHCR also stated that Kurdish parties "denied services to some villages, arrested minorities without due process and took them to undisclosed locations for detention, and pressured minority schools to teach in the Kurdish language”  Christians and Shabak people asserted that in the 2005 elections,  "non-resident Kurds entered the polling centre and over 200 had voted by the time MNF intervened and stopped the illegal voting". In  2005, a peaceful demonstration by Shabak people "turned violent after KDP gunmen shot at the crowd". The UNHCR also stated that Christians run "the risk of arbitrary arrest and incommunicado detention" by Kurdish forces. The Washington Post reported on extrajudicial detentions already in 2005, writing about a “concerted and widespread initiative” by the Kurdish parties to exercise authority in Kirkuk in an increasingly provocative manner", and that arbitrary arrests and abductions by Kurdish militia had “greatly exacerbated tensions along purely ethnic lines.” UNAMI HRO said in 2007 that “(T)hey [religious minorities] face increasing threats, intimidations and detentions, often in KRG facilities run by Kurdish intelligence and security forces.”   The Washington Post estimated that there were 600 or more extrajudicial transfers. It was reported that detainees claimed "arbitrary arrests, incommunicado detentions and use of torture and unlawful confiscation of property."  Abuses by Kurdish forces ranged from "threats and intimidation to detention in undisclosed locations without due process”;  The Kurdish parties’ plans to incorporate "disputed areas" like Kirkuk into  Kurdistan are met with resistance by Christian, Arab and Turkmen groups. UNHCR noted that Christians and Arabs in Mosul and Kirkuk and surrounding areas are "under de facto control of the KRG" and "have become victims of threats, harassment and arbitrary detention." UNHCR also said that Christian and Arab Internally displaced people are discriminated against, and those expressing their opposition to the Kurdish parties, by for example taking part in demonstrations risk "arbitrary arrest and detention". The UNHCR also reports that the KDP and PUK "have repeatedly been accused of nepotism, corruption and lack of internal democracy." According to UNHCR, journalists have "repeatedly claimed that press freedom is restricted and that criticism of the ruling parties can lead to physical harassment, seizure of cameras and notebooks and arrest".  In one incident, Kamal Sayid Qadir, was given a 30 years sentence after writing critically about the Kurdish leader Masoud Barzani. The sentence was reduced after international pressure.  Arbitrary detentions by Kurdish authorities of suspected political opponents have also been noted. Minorites have complained about "forcible assimilation into Kurdish society and a trend towards increasing discrimination of the non- Kurdish population", and efforts to dominate and “kurdify” traditionally mixed areas like that of Kirkuk. In a 2006 poll that was conducted in Erbil, Sulaymaniyah and Dahuk 79% of Kurds were against allowing Arabs to come to Iraqi Kurdistan and 63% were against their settlement in the Region.

Assyrian groups have stated that in school textbooks the Kurds alter historical and geographical facts, for example, Assyrian Christian places are given new Kurdish names and historical or Biblical figures are claimed to be Kurdish. The American Mesopotamian Organization (AMO) demanded an official apology from Kurdistan President Massoud Barzani for the murder of Assyrians by Kurds in the past, claiming that thousands of Assyrian Christians were killed in the region in the last century. The organization also  made the news when it criticized a message from Barzani on the occasion of the Assyrian Martyrs Remembrance Day on the 80th birthday of the Semile massacre. The Semile massacre was conducted by a Kurdish general, Bakr Sidqi. But the message made the Assyrians victims of the Simmele massacre martyrs in the ""Kurdistan liberation movement, it was claimed. The Assyrians are also discriminated in the field of work in the Iraqi Kurdistan region. Christian Assyrians often can only work jobs as sales people in liquor shops or beauticians in beauty salons and are therefore targets for Muslim extremists. Many Assyrian shops were burned in 2011. Assyrians are also not allowed in professions such as the following: policemen, soldiers, officers, journalists for major newspapers and TV stations, judges and senior positions within educational institutions. In the KRG-area the local Assyrian history is seen as Kurdish history. City names are changed to Kurdish names. Assyrian heritage is ruined and Assyrian history is not recognised in school books, museums and during memorial days. A number of Assyrian girls are forced by Kurdish criminal organizations to work in prostitution. If they refuse, they are threatened with death. Many of them are vulnerable refugees from the south with little family in the north. The organizations have ties with political leaders. Therefore it is easy to quickly provide these girls with passports, and to send them to EU countries to work there. Assyrians claim that Kurds are working to Kurdify the local Christian population in northern Iraq. Christians have reported that they were forced to identify themselves as Kurds in order to access education or healthcare services. Yazidis and Shabaks "are not recognised as separate ethnicities and Assyrians that originate from northern Iraq are encouraged more and more to identify as Kurdistani or Kurdish Christians". The KRG has also engaged in discriminatory behaviour against non-Kurdish minorities. Many Assyrians and Yazidis in the Nineveh Plains claim "that the KRG confiscated their property without compensation and that it has begun building settlements on their land." There were also reports from the area "about killings of Assyrians by agents of Kurdish political parties". The Kurds rely largely on "intimidation, threats, restriction of access to services, random arrests and extrajudicial detentions, to persuade their political opponents and ordinary members of these communities to support the KRG’s plan to expand into the disputed territories".  In 2014, Assyrians claimed that the KDP was systematically disarming, and then abandoning Assyrian and other minorities in preparation for an ISIS assault. The KRG distributed notices to Assyrians in Northern Iraq demanding full disarmament in 2014. Assyrians were disarmed and reassured that the Kurdish Peshmerga would protect them against ISIS. But when ISIS attacked, the Peshmerga suddenly retreated. A similar event unfolded when Kurdish Peshmerga retreated when ISIS advanced in the Sinjar region and Shingal in 2014. Peshmerga general and spokesman for the Peshmerga Ministry Holgard Hekmat said in an interview with SpiegelOnline: “Our soldiers just ran away. It’s a shame and apparently a reason which is why they invent such allegations ”. It is estimated that 150,000 Assyrian Christians were violently driven from their ancestral homes in the Nineveh Plains. A KRG official was quoted in a Reuters article inn 2014 as saying “ISIL gave us in two weeks what Maliki couldn’t give us in eight years”.

Some Assyrians activists claim they have suffered not only from Arabization but also Kurdification in Iraqi Kurdistan. Assyrian activist have claimed that the number of Christians live in Iraqi Kurdistan have been reduced  due to the destruction of villages or Kurdification policies. Christians and Assyrian Christians used to constitute a much higher proportion of the population of northern Iraq and Iraqi Kurdistan than they do today. Their numbers were seriously reduced due to massacres, flight and other reasons. In Kurdistan there are also crypto-Christians, people who were outwardly Kurdish Muslims but still remembered having been Armenians or Nestorian Christians. Relations between the remaining Christians and the Kurds were often been less than cordial.  According to Assyrian expert Michael Youash, in some cases Christians became refugees because Kurds seized their land and the KRG would not provide any help in returning the land to them. Michael Youash also reported that in 2007 there were "numerous reports of Kurdish authorities discriminating against minorities in the North....Authorities denied services to some villages, arrested minorities without due process and pressured minority schools to teach in the Kurdish language".  Additionally, several reports have been written about those Christians who do not get "political" representation and therefore do not succeed in expanding their schools, and are shut out from all but the most basic funding.  Assyrian groups reported a series of bombings in  1998 and 1999 and criticized the investigation into these crimes by the Kurdish authorities. Assyrians were also victims of attacks by the Kurdistan Workers Party, and Christians often are trapped in the middle of intra-Kurdish fighting. In 1997, six Assyrians died in an attack by the PKK in Dohuk.   According to a 1999 country report by the US government, the Assyrian International News Agency reported that an Assyrian woman Helena Aloun Sawa, killed and raped. She was a housekeeper for a KDP politician, and Assyrians have alleged that the case "resembles a well-established pattern" of complicity by Kurdish authorities in attacks against Assyrian Christians in northern Iraq".  In more recent times, some scholars have noted that  in northern Iraq, in the area of "ancient Assyria, Kurdish expansion has come at the
expense of the Assyrian population".  Due to both Arab and Kurdish intimidation
policies, especially on the part of the Kurdish
Democratic Party, the Aramaic speaking Christian
population has been much reduced. It was claimed that Kurds have "raised
impediments to acquisition of international aid for
development, attempted to prevent the establishment of
Aramaic language schools and prevented the establishment of Christian Assyrian schools", and the issues were also criticized by the US State
Department. There were also attacks on Christians by both Arab and Kurdish Islamists groups such as IS and the Kurdish Ansar ul-Islam.  Kurdish forces have been accused of harassing Arab residents. Assyrian Christian refugees have been blocked from returning to their villages across the Nineveh Plain by the Kurdish Regional Government, a report from The Investigative Project on Terrorism said. Jeff Gardiner, director of 'Restore Nineveh Now', said “The Kurdish authorities did not protect the people of the Nineveh Plain. In a way, this was enabled by the Kurdish government. They really set them [Assyrians] up for this catastrophic outcome.” Claims that there is a security risk are false according to Gardiner. He called the KRG's actions a “land grab”. Robert Nicholson of The Philios Project said: "For months we've been receiving numerous reports from Assyrian Christians and Yazidis that Kurdish forces are using the fog of war to seize land that rightfully belongs to victims of genocide. Each week those reports are increasing. The Nineveh Plain has never been a Kurdish territory. It belongs to the Christians (Assyrians) and Yazidis who have been living there for thousands of years.” Members of the Nineveh Protection Units (an Assyrian militia) have been waylayed by the KRG. Their movements were also being impeded by Kurdish forces. In a letter to Kurdistani President Masoud Barzani, John McCain complained about ""reports of land confiscation and statements you have made regarding Kurdish territorial claims to the Nineveh Plains region". And according to Gardner, "This is nothing new. Assyrian Christians complained about the illegal settlement of Kurdistani families on Assyrian land in the early 1990s. The ultimate strategy aims to unify Iraq's Kurds with those in Syria and Turkey in a broader Kurdish state". In December 2011 hundreds of Kurds in Zakho burned and destroyed Christian Assyrian businesses and hotels after Friday prayers. Human rights groups suggested the riot were planned by Kurdish authorities and that security representatives had made inquiries about liquor stores three days before the riots, and security forces did not intervene to stop the riots. Assyrians are also discriminated against in the labour market and face administrative burdens such as the duty to obtain a residence permit (for Internally displaced people) on an annual basis. Assyrian students were being "treated and rated in a different way than Kurdish students". Assyrians also "suffer abuses and discriminations as a result of KRGs aspiration to extend its control and its plans to reshaping demography in Mosul and the Nineveh Plains." An official police composed of Assyrians has "not been established because of massive resistance from Kurdish groups". Government complicity in "religiously-motivated discrimination has been reported in the Kurdish Regional Government (KRG)". According to the State Department, Christians “living in areas north of Mosul asserted that the KRG confiscated their property ... without compensation and ... Assyrian Christians also alleged that the Kurdish Democratic Party-dominated judiciary routinely discriminates against non-Muslims.” ChaldoAssyrian Christians have also said that KRG officials "deny Christians key social benefits, including employment and housing" and that "foreign reconstruction assistance for Assyrian communities were being controlled by the KRG". KRG officials have used "public works projects to divert water and other vital resources from Assyrian to Kurdish communities".  These deprivations led to mass exodus, which was followed by "the seizure and conversion of abandoned Assyrian property by the local Kurdish population". Turkmen groups report "similar abuses by Kurdish officials, suggesting a pattern of pervasive discrimination, harassment, and marginalization." Violence against Iraq's Christian community "remains a significant concern, particularly in Baghdad and the northern Kurdish regions" and there is a pattern of "official discrimination, harassment, and marginalization by KRG officials which exacerbate these conditions." Kurdish groups have been accused of trying to annex into the KRG territories belonging to Assyrians "claiming that these areas are historically Kurdish".  Since 2003, "Kurdish peshmerga, security forces, and political parties have moved into these territories, establishing de facto control over many of the disputed areas".  Assyrians and Shabak and Turkomen groups have accused Kurdish forces "of engaging in systematic abuses and discrimination against them to further Kurdish territorial claims".  These accusations include "reports of Kurdish officials interfering with minorities‘ voting rights; encroaching on, seizing, and refusing to return minority land; conditioning the provision of services and assistance to minority communities on support for Kurdish expansion; forcing minorities to identify themselves as either Arabs or Kurds; and impeding the formation of local minority police forces."

Freedom of speech and political freedom

Kurdish officials in Iraq have accused the ruling Kurdistan Democratic Party (KDP), led by Masoud Barzani, of “all kinds of intimidation,” corruption, as well as ballot stuffing. During the 2005 elections, "Kurdish authorities given the task of delivering ballot boxes to Assyrian districts in Iraqi Kurdistan failed to do so, while Assyrian election workers were fired on and killed". As a consequence the Assyrian Democratic Movement was marginalized.

The current state of human rights
There have been major criticisms by numerous human rights organizations and Shiite officials that currently Sunnis have systematically kidnapped, tortured and killed Shiites or those who they deem the enemy. Amnesty International has extensively criticized the Iraqi government for its handling of the Walid Yunis Ahmad case, in which an ethnically-Turkmen journalist from Iraqi Kurdistan was held for ten years without charge or trial.

According to the Human Rights Watch annual report, the human rights situation in Iraq is deplorable. Since 2015, the country entered a bloody armed conflict between ISIS and coalition of Kurdish, central Iraqi government forces, pro-government militias, and a United States-led international air campaign. United nations revealed that 3.2 million Iraqis were displaced because of the conflict. In addition, the international organization said that the conflicting parties used several ways including extrajudicial executions, suicide attacks, and airstrikes which killed and injured over 20,000 civilians.

An Amnesty International report concluded that "Peshmerga forces of the semi-autonomous Kurdistan Regional Government (KRG) were preventing residents of Arab villages and Arab residents of mixed Arab-Kurdish towns from returning to their homes, and in some cases have destroyed or permitted the destruction of their homes and property – seemingly as a way to prevent their return in the future."In many cases, Arab houses were "looted, intentionally burned down, bulldozed or blown up after the fighting had ended and Peshmerga forces were in control of the areas." and the report noted that these were not isolated incidents, but examples of a wider pattern. Amnesty also noted that "the forced displacement of Arab residents and the extensive, unlawful destruction of civilian homes and property  violate international humanitarian law and should be investigated as war crimes". Amnesty International noted that the village of Tabaj Hamid for example had been razed to the ground. In Jumeili 95 percent of all walls and low lying structures have been destroyed. Amnesty International researchers were apprehended by Peshmerga, who escorted them out of the area and prevented them from taking photographs. Amnesty said that "The deliberate demolition of civilian homes  is unlawful under international humanitarian law, and Amnesty considered that these instances of forced displacement constitute war crimes. Amnesty International also urged the KRG authorities to promptly and independently investigate all deaths that occurred during protests against the KDP (such as in October 2015), and to disclose the findings.

Amnesty criticized that peshmerga forces from the Kurdistan Regional Government (KRG) and Kurdish militias in northern Iraq have bulldozed, blown up and burned down thousands of homes in an apparent effort to uproot Arab communities. The report, Banished and Dispossessed: Forced Displacement and Deliberate Destruction in Northern Iraq, is based on field investigation in Iraq. It said that "tens of thousands of Arab civilians who were forced to flee their homes because of fighting are now struggling to survive in makeshift camps in desperate conditions. Many have lost their livelihoods and all their possessions and with their homes destroyed, they have nothing to return to. By barring the displaced from returning to their villages and destroying their homes KRG forces are further exacerbating their suffering." The report revealed evidence of forced displacement and large-scale destruction of homes in villages and towns by the peshmerga. Human Rights Watch reported that Kurds have denied Arabs the right to return to their homes, while Kurds had free movement and could even move into the homes that belonged to Arabs. In a 2016 report "‘Where are we supposed to go?’: Destruction and forced displacement in Kirkuk", Amnesty International stated that Kurdish authorities have demolished and bulldozed people's homes and forcibly displaced hundreds of Arab residents. In 2005 the KDP opened fire on protestors at a demonstration by the Democratic Shabak Coalition, killing two Assyrians and leaving several other Assyrians and Shabak wounded. Assyrian groups have also accused Kurds for election rigging in northern Iraq and for preventing Assyrian representation in politics.

Also Shabak people suffer from discrimination. Hunain al-Qaddo, a Shabak politician, was quoted by Human Rights Watch that "the peshmerga have no genuine interest in protecting his community, and that Kurdish security forces are more interested in controlling Shabaks and their leaders than protecting them." He also said that they are "suffering at the hands of the peshmerga and that the Kurdish government refuse to let the Iraq armed forces protect them and have rejected the idea of allowing them to establish their own Shabak police force to protect their people.” Kurdish forces have been implicated in some of the attacks against Shabaks. The prominent Mullah Khadim Abbas, leader of the Shabak Democratic Gathering, a group that opposes the incorporation of Shabak villages into the territory of the KRG,  was killed in 2008 only 150 meters away from a peshmerga outpost. Abbas had prior to his killing angered Kurdish authorities by criticizing fellow "Shabaks working for the Kurdish agenda and denouncing Kurdish policies that in his view undermined the fabric of the community’s identity." In 2009, Shabak lawmaker al-Qaddo survived an assassination attempt in the Nineveh Plains.The attackers were wearing Kurdish security uniforms, he told Human Rights Watch. He also said that the Kurdish government will have an easier time imposing their will on the Shabak and obtaining their lands if they kill him. Shabak leaders have complained about impunity for killings. In some of these incidents, the KDP was accused of not investigating killings of non-Kurdish civilians by the peshmerga. HRW reported that "the root of the problem is the near-universal perception among Kurdish leaders that minority groups are, in fact, Kurds", and it reported that "Kurdish authorities have sometimes dealt harshly with Yazidi and Shabak members who resist attempts to impose on them a Kurdish identity".

Sectarian warfare in Iraq
Iraq was in a state of sectarian civil war from 2006 to 2008. Small groups as well as militia engaged in bombings in civilian areas and in assassination of officials of various levels, and against Shiites and smaller religious minorities. Secular-oriented individuals, officials of the new government, aides to the United States (such as translators), individuals and families of the nation's various religious groups are subject to violence and death threats.

Refugee response to threats to life
 See also Refugees of Iraq. 

As a result of attempted murders and death threats 2 million Iraqis have left Iraq. They have mainly gone to Syria, Jordan and Egypt.

Propaganda
On February 17, 2006 then-U.S. Secretary of Defense Donald Rumsfeld reported about new realities in the media age:

"In Iraq, for example, the U.S. military command, working closely with the Iraqi government and the U.S. embassy, has sought nontraditional means to provide accurate information to the Iraqi people in the face of aggressive campaign of disinformation. Yet this has been portrayed as inappropriate; for example, the allegations of someone in the military hiring a contractor, and the contractor allegedly paying someone to print a story—a true story—but paying to print a story."

"The U.S. military plans to continue paying Iraqi newspapers to publish articles favorable to the United States after an inquiry found no fault with the controversial practice," Army General George Casey said March 3, 2006. Casey said that "the internal review had concluded that the U.S. military was not violating U.S. law or Pentagon guidelines with the information operations campaign, in which U.S. troops and a private contractor write pro-American articles and pay to have them planted without attribution in Iraqi media."

The legal status of Freedom of Speech and the Press is also unclear in Iraq. Both freedoms are promised in the Iraqi Constitution, with exemptions for Islamic morality and national security. However, the operating Iraqi Criminal Code of 1969 has vague prohibitions to using the press or any electronic means of communication for "indecent" purposes.

Women's rights

Women in Iraq at the beginning of the 21st century are immersed status is affected by many factors: wars (most recently the Iraq War), sectarian religious conflict, debates concerning Islamic law and Iraq's Constitution, cultural traditions, and modern secularism. Hundreds of thousands of Iraqi women are widowed as a result of a series of wars and internal conflicts. Women's rights organizations struggle against harassment and intimidation while they work to promote improvements to women's status in the law, in education, the workplace, and many other spheres of Iraqi life. According to a 2008 report in the Washington Post, the Kurdistan region of Iraq is one of the few places in the world where female genital mutilation had been rampant. In 2008. the United Nations Assistance Mission for Iraq (UNAMI) has stated that honor killings are a serious concern in Iraq, particularly in Iraqi Kurdistan. Honor killings are common in Iraqi Kurdistan, women also face forced and underage marriage, domestic violence or polygamy issues. Since the early 1990s, several thousand Iraqi Kurdish women died of self-immolation.

Other human rights

The United States through the CPA abolished the death penalty (since reinstated) and ordered that Criminal Code of 1969 (as amended in 1985) and the Civil Code of 1974 would be the operating legal system in Iraq. However, there has been some debate as to how far the CPA rules have been applied.

For example, the Iraqi Criminal Code of 1969 (as amended in 1985) does not prohibit forming a trade union and the Iraqi Constitution promises that such an organization will be recognized (a right under Article 23 of the Universal Declaration of Human Rights), but for some reason the Iraqi courts and special tribunal seem to be operating under a slightly revised version of the 1988 legal code, and thus a 1987 ban on unions might still be in place.

Likewise, while the Iraqi Criminal Code of 1969 or the apparent 1988 edition do not expressly prohibit homosexual relations between consenting adults in private (a right under a United Nations Human Rights Commission ruling in 1994), scattered reports seem to suggest that homosexuality is still being treated as a crime, possibly a capital crime under a 2001 amendment that technically should not exist. For more information on this topic see Gay rights in Iraq.

Post COVID-19 Rights 
During COVID-19 the Iraqi government called for much stricter curfews and shopping hours. This was done instead of normal lockdowns to allow Iraq's economy to stay afloat. Human welfare was significantly worse due to droughts in the area. The modern government did not assist the majority of the population in the crises. All but two refugee camps were closed and internally displaced people were targeted by armed forces. Many of the displaced families were fleeing from the Syrian civil war. In December and November of 2021 many flash floods were caused by heavy rainfall causing families to become homeless or misplaced, internal and external.

Notes

See also

 Prisoner abuse
 Operation Phantom Fury
 Human rights in pre-Saddam Iraq
 Human rights in Saddam Hussein's Iraq
 2003 invasion of Iraq
 Abu Ghraib prisoner abuse
 Human Rights Record of the United States
 Country Reports on Human Rights Practices
 Slavery in Iraq
 Gay rights in Iraq
 Refugees of Iraq
 Sectarianism
 Religious war

References

External links

General human rights
Assyrian Human Rights Report
  Human Rights Watch: Background on the Crisis in Iraq (a contents page for the organization's various reports on Iraq, mostly after Saddam's regime fell)
 Iraq Inter-Agency Information & Analysis Unit Reports, Maps and Assessments of Iraq's Governorates from the UN Inter-Agency Information & Analysis Unit
  U.S. Department of State Country Report on Human Rights Practices: Iraq, 2005 (released March 8, 2006)
  Freedom House 2006 report on Iraq

Torture

Pictures of the abuse by US soldiers, courtesy of The Memory Hole. Note that the full set of pictures has not been released, including the rape of a young Iraqi by a military contractor.

The Guardian: Soldier arrested over Iraqi torture photos (May 31, 2003)
Washington Post:  'Torture Lite' Takes Hold in War on Terror (March 3, 2004)
US tactics condemned by British officers (April 21, 2004) (Daily Telegraph)
CBS 60 minutes II: Abuse Of Iraqi POWs By GIs Probed (April 29, 2004)
BBC: US acts after Iraq prisoner abuse, (30 April 2004)
Doubt cast on Iraq torture photos (May 2, 2004) (BBC)
13 reasons why this picture may not be all it seems (May 2, 2004) (Daily Telegraph)
This Is Not A Hoax. I Saw It, I Was There (Answers to some of the objections; May 3, 2004) (The Daily Mirror) (Alternative link)
A third UK soldier steps up (May 7, 2004) (The Guardian)
Mirror admits it was "hoaxed" (May 15, 2004) (The Daily Mirror)
Two Danish physicians attest to British abuse (May 15, 2004) (The New Zealand Herald)
New Details of Prison Abuse Emerge (May 21, 2004)
Report: Army doctors involved in Abu Ghraib abuse (2004-08-20) (Reuters)
Chain of Command: The Road from 9/11 to Abu Ghraib - Interview with Seymour Hersh by Democracy Now! on September 14, 2004.
Journalists Among Those Abused by US Troops (IFEX)
U.S. State Department on Iraq Human rights in 2004 (released 2005) Country Reports on Human Rights Practices section on Iraq. 460 KB in size for the Iraq portion alone. HTML. One page. No pictures, all English text.
 Editorial: Patterns of Abuse, New York Times, May 23, 2005
 UN raises alarm on death squads and torture in Iraq (Reuters, September 8, 2005)
 US Troops Seize Award-Winning Iraqi Journalist, The Guardian, January 9, 2006
 Thank You Joe Darby – A site for expressions of support for Joe Darby, the soldier that exposed the graphic photos and video and brought the Abu Ghraib prison scandal to light.
 Iraq general's killer reprimanded, BBC, January 24, 2006
 Mild Penalties in Military Abuse Cases, Los Angeles Times, January 25, 2006

Death Squads
, Newsweek, January 14, 2005
Sunni men in Baghdad targeted by attackers in police uniforms, Knight Ridder, June 28, 2005
539 Bodies Found in Iraq Since April, AP, October 7, 2005
Ex-PM: Abuse as bad as Saddam era, CNN, November 27, 2005
Killings Linked to Shiite Squads in Iraqi Police Force, LA Times, November 29, 2005
Sunnis Accuse Iraqi Military of Kidnappings and Slayings, NY Times, November 29, 2005
Iraq's Death Squads: On the Brink of Civil War, The Independent, February 26, 2006
Bound, Blindfolded and Dead: The Face of Revenge in Baghdad, NY Times, March 26, 2006
Iraq militias' wave of death, Boston Globe, April 2, 2006

Human rights abuses in Iraq
21st century in Iraq
George W. Bush administration controversies
Articles containing video clips